Thomas "Tom" Gallen, Jr. (born December 28, 1932) is a retired Florida state legislator and circuit judge.

Early life and education 

Gallen was born in Tampa, Florida in 1932. He attended the University of Tampa, leaving during the Korean War in order to enlist in the Army Special Forces. He was a member of the inaugural group of Green Berets formed in 1952 and deployed to Bad Tölz, Germany in 1953, serving until 1955. After leaving the army he returned to school, receiving a BS in Business Administration from Florida State University and a Juris Doctor degree from the University of Florida. Gallen's father, Thomas Gallen, Sr., had been an attorney as well, practicing for only a few months before the Great Depression, then leaving law, but Gallen Jr. was never made aware of this fact until after his own graduation from law school.

Legal career and public service 

Gallen was a law partner at the law firm of Miller Gallen Kaklis and Venable from 1960 to 1985. During this period he also held public office, serving as a member of the Florida legislature for 12 years, first in the Florida House of Representatives, where he served from 1965–1972, before being elected to the Florida Senate. During his time in the Senate, he became chairman of the senate rules and calendar committee. He served in the Florida Senate from 1972-1978 before leaving office, opting to return to practicing law rather than seeking reelection. In 1985, he was elected to the 12th Judicial Circuit as a circuit judge, where he was elected as chief judge in 1998, and served until he retired in 2002. In 2005, Judge Gallen received the Manatee County Bar lifetime achievement award. He served as a senior circuit judge for the 12th Judicial Circuit and associate judge on the 2nd District Court of Appeals. In 2009, he issued a legal opinion that lead to the release of James Bain following 35 years in prison, after DNA evidence was used to prove he was wrongfully convicted of rape. In 2013, Gallen was named to the Manatee County Rural Health Services board of directors.

References 

1932 births
Living people
Florida lawyers
Democratic Party members of the Florida House of Representatives
Politicians from Tampa, Florida
Florida State University alumni
University of Florida alumni